JVB may refer to:

Jain Vishva Bharati University, Ladnun, Rajasthan, India
Jong Vlaanderen-Bauknecht or Ventilair-Steria Cycling Team, a former Continental cycling team 2005–2013 based in Belgium
Jotunheimen og Valdresruten Bilselskap, a transport company with headquarters in Fagernes, Nord-Aurdal, Oppland, Norway